The April 2018 inter-Korean summit took place on 27 April 2018 on the South Korean side of the Joint Security Area, between Moon Jae-in, President of South Korea, and Kim Jong-un, Chairman of the Workers' Party of Korea and Supreme Leader of North Korea. The summit was the third inter-Korean summit - the first in eleven years. It was also the first time since the end of the Korean War in 1953 that a North Korean leader entered the South's territory; President Moon also briefly crossed into the North's territory.

The summit took place after the two sides had already held several meetings in preparation for their joint attendance at the 2018 Winter Olympics. The idea was initially brought forward through an official invitation from the North to conduct a meeting. The summit was focused on the North Korean nuclear weapons program and denuclearization of the Korean Peninsula. The Panmunjom Declaration was made following the summit.

Agenda
The two Koreas' high government officials held a working-level meeting on 4 April 2018 to discuss summit details at the Peace House in the Korean Demilitarized Zone. The agenda was planned to include denuclearization, peace establishment and improvement of inter-Korean relations for their mutual benefit. More than 200 NGOs called for human rights issues in the North to be added to the agenda and Japanese Prime Minister Shinzō Abe petitioned to include the North Korean abductions of Japanese citizens as well, but these topics were ultimately excluded from the summit.

Meeting

The Peace House, located just south of the military demarcation line in the Joint Security Area of Panmunjeom, was accepted as the meeting's location by North Korea from among the venues proposed by South Korea.

The meeting was the first visit by a North Korean leader to South Korean territory after the Korean War (1950–53).
The start of the meeting was broadcast live and featured the two leaders shaking hands over the demarcation line. Moon then accepted an invitation from Kim to briefly step over to the North's side of the line, a seemingly impromptu moment, before the two walked together to the Peace House. There was some controversy with the arrangement of a joint-service guard of honor formed by the Republic of Korea Armed Forces for Chairman Kim. The South Korean Ministry of National Defense justified this move by pointing out that Presidents Kim Dae-jung and Roh Moo-hyun were given an equally welcoming reception during their visits to the DPRK in 2000 and 2007, respectively. The Ministry also used the Cold War as a historical reference, saying that "when violent conflicts continued between the United States and the Soviet Union, the United States and China, honor guards were organized for leaders of other countries". The official website of the Blue House had a petition that was signed by over a thousand people who opposed the reception.

Along with the scheduled talks, the two leaders conducted a tree-planting ceremony using soil and water from both territories and attended a banquet. Many elements of the meeting were expressly designed for symbolism, including an oval meeting table measuring 2,018 millimetres to represent the year.

Other attendees
The two leaders were accompanied by their wives, Kim Jung-sook and Ri Sol-ju, and a number of other individuals were present at the meeting:

North Korea
Kim Yong-nam, President of the Presidium of the Supreme People's Assembly and nominal head of state
Kim Yo-jong, sister of Kim Jong-un, alternate member of the Politburo (Political Bureau)
Kim Yong-chol, Vice Chairman of the Workers' Party of Korea
Choe Hwi, Vice Chairman of the Workers' Party of Korea
Ri Son-gwon, Chairman of the Committee for the Peaceful Reunification of the Fatherland
Ri Myong-su, chief of the general staff of the Korean People's Army
Ri Yong-ho, foreign minister
Ri Su-yong, Vice Chairman of the Workers' Party of Korea
Pak Yong-sik, Minister of People's Armed Forces

South Korea

Chung Eui-yong, National Security Office director, equivalent to national security advisor
Suh Hoon, National Intelligence Service director
Cho Myoung-gyon, Minister of Unification
Im Jong-seok, Chief Presidential Secretary, equivalent to chief of staff, and chairman of South Korea's summit preparatory committee
Song Young-moo, Minister of National Defense
Kang Kyung-wha, Minister of Foreign Affairs
Jeong Kyeong-doo, Chairman of the Joint Chiefs of Staff

Dokdo desserts and Japanese culinary complaint

On 24 April 2018, the Japanese Foreign Ministry protested to the Embassy of the Republic of Korea in the State of Japan, citing the appearance of desserts named "Dokdo" on the dinner menu that was to be used during the summit. Dokdo is the Korean name of a small island group, known as Takeshima in Japanese, that is midway between the Republic of Korea and Japan. It is the subject of a long-standing sovereignty dispute. The mango mousse desserts were accompanied by Korean-style decorations and a depiction of the Korean peninsula that included the islands. On 27 April 2018, Tarō Kōno, Japanese Minister of Foreign Affairs, said he felt it was unnecessary to have a "Dokdo" dessert and reiterated claims that the island group is a territory of Japan. Despite the complaint, the Dokdo desserts were served to both Moon Jae-in and Kim Jong-un during the summit. Both men also personally cracked open their desserts with small mallets to symbolize a new relationship.

Joint press conference and agreement

In a joint press conference, Kim and Moon made a number of pledges regarding co-operation and peace. Notably, these included a pledge to work towards the denuclearization of the Korean peninsula, although Kim did not explicitly agree to give up the North's nuclear weapons. The two leaders also agreed to convert the Korean Armistice Agreement into a full peace treaty later that year, formally ending the Korean War after 65 years. Additionally, they pledged to end "hostile activities" between their nations, resume reunion meetings for divided families, improve connections along their border, and cease propaganda broadcasts across the border. This agreement was known as the Panmunjom Declaration for Peace, Prosperity and Unification of the Korean Peninsula and was signed by both leaders in the South Korean border village of Panmunjom.

The press conference was shown live on South Korean television; however, live coverage was not available in North Korea since the country's policy is to not broadcast live events involving its leader.

As the press conference concluded, the two leaders pledged greater communication between themselves and planned for Moon to visit Pyongyang in late 2018.

Aftermath

In the aftermath of the summit, it was agreed that the loudspeakers in the Korean Demilitarized Zone would be dismantled beginning on 1 May. This commitment was fulfilled as planned and both sides committed to ending their balloon propaganda campaigns as well.  On 5 May, an attempt by North Korean defectors to continue the balloon campaign across the border from South Korea was halted by the South Korean government.  Also on 5 May, North Korea changed its time zone so that it would match South Korea's.

During the 2018 World Team Table Tennis Championships, the table tennis teams from the two Koreas entered separately, but when they were paired against each other at the quarter-final of the women's event, they negotiated instead to field a joint team for the semifinal, with the agreement of the International Table Tennis Federation. The Korea Team went on to lose to Japan 3–0 in the semi-finals.

May 2018 summit

On 26 May, Kim and Moon met again in the Joint Security Area, this time on the North Korean side of the Panmunjom village. The meeting took two hours, and unlike other summits it was not publicly announced beforehand. Photos released by South Korea's presidential office showed Moon arriving at the northern side of the Panmunjom truce village and shaking hands with Kim's sister, Kim Yo-jong, before sitting down with Kim for their summit. Moon was accompanied by his spy chief, Suh Hoon, while Kim was joined by Kim Yong-chol, a former military intelligence chief who is now a vice chairman of the North Korean ruling party's central committee tasked with inter-Korean relations. The meeting was largely centered around Kim Jong Un's upcoming summit with US President Donald Trump. Kim and Moon also embraced before Moon returned to South Korea. Moon revealed details of the summit in a public address on 27 May.

September 2018 summit

On 13 August, it was announced that a third 2018 inter-Korean summit would be held in the North Korean capital of Pyongyang on an unspecified day in September. The meeting was designed to capitalize on what was accomplished at the previous two summits. Ri Son Gwon, the head of the North Korean delegation, told reporters that a specific date for the summit was already set, but that they wanted to "keep reporters wondering." It was announced on 31 August that South Korean President Moon Jae-In would send a special delegation to North Korea on 5 September to hold more nuclear talks and set up the summit. The summit lasted three days, from 18 September to 20 September.

See also
 Inter-Korean summits
 2018 North Korea–United States Singapore Summit
 North Korea–South Korea relations
 Korean reunification
 Northern Limit Line
 2017–18 North Korea crisis
 Inter-Korean House of Freedom
 List of international trips made by Kim Jong-un
 Kim–Xi meetings

References

External links

2018 Inter-Korean Summit The official website of the 2018 Inter-Korean Summit 
2018 Inter-Korean Summit The official website of the 2018 Inter-Korean Summit 
The full text of the agreement

2018 conferences
Inter-Korean summit
Inter-Korean summit
Inter-Korean summit
Aftermath of the Korean War
Inter-Korean summit
Kim Jong-un
Moon Jae-in Government
North Korea–South Korea relations
Politics of Korea
Panmunjom
Inter-Korean summit